Roger Hippertchen (21 October 1923 – 21 February 1984) was a Luxembourgian weightlifter. He competed in the men's lightweight event at the 1960 Summer Olympics.

References

1923 births
1984 deaths
Luxembourgian male weightlifters
Olympic weightlifters of Luxembourg
Weightlifters at the 1960 Summer Olympics
Sportspeople from Esch-sur-Alzette